Diogo Portela (born 12 June 1988) is a Brazilian professional darts player who plays in Professional Darts Corporation (PDC) and World Darts Federation (WDF) events.

Career
Originally from Rio de Janeiro, Portela first came into prominence in 2015 when he appeared on the Sky1 darts show One Hundred and Eighty, where with the help of James Wade, he won £16,000.

His first foray into professional darts was when he tried to win a PDC Tour Card in 2017, but while he failed to do so, he did some other firsts, such as becoming the first Brazilian to win a PDC European Tour match when he defeated Martin Schindler in the first round of the German Darts Championship.

In June 2017, he and Alexandre Sattin became the first pair to represent Brazil in the World Cup of Darts in Frankfurt, Germany. They defeated Switzerland 5–4 in a last-leg decider, before losing to the host nation pair of Max Hopp and Martin Schindler, with Portela winning their only leg in the two matches. The following year, he and Bruno Rangel would represent Brazil in the 2018 PDC World Cup of Darts, and after breezing past Denmark in round 1, they would lose to the Scotland pairing of Peter Wright and Gary Anderson.

He would qualify for the 2018 and 2019 PDC World Darts Championships by winning the South American qualifier. In 2018, he lost to the number 2 seed Peter Wright, and in 2019, he lost 3–2 to Ron Meulenkamp after being 2–0 up.

Portela did not get Tour card in any Q-school in 2018, 2019 or 2020 and continued playing mainly on PDC Challenge Tour or some BDO tournaments. Occasionally he appeared in some PDPA Players Championship events. He represented Brazil in the 2019 PDC World Cup of Darts, but lost with his partner, Artur Valle, to Sweden 1-5. In October 2019 he made into the semifinal of Northern Ireland Open. After winning yet another South American qualifier, he secured his sport for the third PDC World Darts Championship in a row. This time he did not win a set and lost in the first round against Josh Payne 0-3.

He qualified for the 2021 World Championship and defeated Steve Beaton 3-0 to advance to the 2nd round for the first time in his career, before losing to Glen Durrant.

World Championship results

PDC
2018: First round (lost to Peter Wright 1–3) 
2019: First round (lost to Ron Meulenkamp 2–3)
2020: First round (lost to Josh Payne 0–3)
2021: Second round (lost to Glen Durrant 0–3)
2022: First round (lost to Alan Soutar 2–3)
2023: First round (lost to Cameron Menzies 1–3)

Performance timeline

PDC

References

External links
Profile and stats on Darts Database

1988 births
Living people
Brazilian darts players
PDC World Cup of Darts Brazilian team
Professional Darts Corporation associate players